Now We Are Free may refer to:

 "Now We Are Free" (song), a 2000 song of Lisa Gerrard, from the Hans Zimmer soundtrack, of the Ridley Scott film Gladiator
 Now We Are Free (album), a 2012 album from Leaders

See also
 We're Free (song), a 1972 song by Beverly Bremers off the album I'll Make You Music